Li Weining (Chinese: 李卫宁; pinyin: Lǐ Wèiníng; born October 1959) is currently acting mayor of Jiaxing, Zhejiang Province of China.

He is a member of Chinese Communist Party, and became acting mayor since September 2007.

External links
 Biography of Li Weining, People's Daily Online, September 10, 2007.

1959 births
People's Republic of China politicians from Zhejiang
Living people
Chinese Communist Party politicians from Zhejiang
Political office-holders in Zhejiang
Politicians from Taizhou, Zhejiang